Koe is a given name and a surname. Notable people with the name include:

Surname
 Amanda Lee Koe (born 1988), Singaporean-born American writer
 Benjamin Koe (1816–1842), English cricket player
 Fred Koe (born 1947), Canadian politician
 Jamie Koe (born 1977), Canadian curler
 Kenneth Koe (1925–2015), American chemist
 Kevin Koe (born 1975), Canadian curler
 Kerry Koe (born 1977), Canadian curler
 Koe Yeet (born 1992), Malaysian actress

Given name
 Koe Wetzel (born 1992), American country music singer and songwriter